In the United States, a pharmacy benefit manager (PBM) is a third-party administrator of prescription drug programs for commercial health plans, self-insured employer plans, Medicare Part D plans, the Federal Employees Health Benefits Program, and state government employee plans. According to the American Pharmacists Association, "PBMs are primarily responsible for developing and maintaining the formulary, contracting with pharmacies, negotiating discounts and rebates with drug manufacturers, and processing and paying prescription drug claims." PBMs operate inside of integrated healthcare systems (e.g., Kaiser Permanente or Veterans Health Administration), as part of retail pharmacies (e.g., CVS Pharmacy or Rite-Aid), and as part of insurance companies (e.g., UnitedHealth Group).

As of 2016, PBMs managed pharmacy benefits for 266 million Americans.  In 2017, the largest PBMs had higher revenue than the largest pharmaceutical manufacturers, indicating their increasingly large role in healthcare in the United States. However, in 2016 there were fewer than 30 major PBM companies in this category in the US, and three major PBMs (Express Scripts, CVS Health, and OptumRx of UnitedHealth Group) comprise 78% of the market and cover 180 million enrollees.

Business model
In the United States, health insurance providers often hire an outside company to handle price negotiations, insurance claims, and distribution of prescription drugs.  Providers which use such pharmacy benefit managers include commercial health plans, self-insured employer plans, Medicare Part D plans, the Federal Employees Health Benefits Program, and state government employee plans. PBMs are designed to aggregate the collective buying power of enrollees through their client health plans, enabling plan sponsors and individuals to obtain lower prices for their prescription drugs. PBMs negotiate price discounts from retail pharmacies, rebates from pharmaceutical manufacturers, and mail-service pharmacies which home-deliver prescriptions without consulting face-to-face with a pharmacist.

Pharmacy benefit management companies can make revenue in several ways. First, they collect administrative and service fees from the original insurance plan. They can also collect rebates from the manufacturer. Traditional PBMs do not disclose the negotiated net price of the prescription drugs, allowing them to resell drugs at a public list price (also known as a sticker price) which is higher than the net price they negotiate with the manufacturer. This practice is known as "spread pricing". Savings are generally considered trade secrets. Pharmacies and insurance companies are often prohibited by the PBM from discussing costs and reimbursements. This leads to lack of transparency.

The formulary

PBMs advise their clients on ways to "structure drug benefits" and offer complex selections at a variety of price rates from which clients choose. This happens by constructing a "formulary" or list of specific drugs that will be covered by the healthcare plan. The formulary is usually divided into several "tiers" of preference, with low tiers being assigned a higher copay to incentivize consumers to buy drugs on a preferred tier. Drugs which do not appear on the formulary at all mean consumers must pay the full list price. To get drugs listed on the formulary, manufacturers are usually required to pay the PBM a manufacturer's rebate, which lowers the net price of the drug, while keeping the list price the same. Pharmaceutical manufacturers say that in order to cover the cost of these rebates, they are forced to raise the price of drugs. For example, the president of Eli Lilly and Company claims the cost of discounts and rebates accounts for 75% of the list price of insulin. PBMs such as Express Scripts claim rebates are a response to rising list prices, and are not the cause of them.

The complex pricing structure of the formulary can have unexpected consequences. When filing an insurance claim, patients usually are charged an insurance copayment which is based on the public list price, and not the confidential net price. Around a quarter of the time, the cost of the insurance copayment on the list price is more than the entire price of the drug bought directly in cash. The PBM can then pocket the difference, in a practice known as a "clawback". Consumers can choose to buy the drug in cash, but in their contracts with pharmacies, PBMs would forbid pharmacists from telling consumers about the possibility of buying their medication for a cheaper price without an insurance claim, unless consumers directly ask about it. Since 2017, six states have passed legislation making such "gag clauses" illegal. This has recently been followed by a federal bans on gag orders for private insurance effective Oct 2018, and for Medicare effective Jan 2020.

Net effect on consumers
Overall, the PBM industry claims to provide significant cost savings for end users. For example, in 2015, CVS Caremark said that it reduced its plan members' prescription drug spending to 5%, down from 11.8% in 2014. However, such conclusions can be controversial. A 2013 investigation of PBM marketing from Fortune Magazine showed: Drug pricing is difficult to untangle and customers have no way of knowing how much they are saving.

History 

In 1968, the first PBM was founded when Pharmaceutical Card System Inc. (PCS, later AdvancePCS) invented the plastic benefit card. By the "1970s, [they] serve[d] as fiscal intermediaries by adjudicating prescription drug claims by paper and then, in the 1980s, electronically".

By the late 1980s, PBMs had become a major force "as health care and prescription costs were escalating". Diversified Pharmaceutical Services was one of the earliest examples of a PBM which came from within a national health maintenance organization United HealthCare (now United HealthGroup).  After SmithKline Beecham acquired DPS in 1994, Diversified played a pivotal role in its Healthcare Service division and by 1999 UnitedHealth Group accounted for 44% of Diversified Pharmaceutical Services's total membership. Express Scripts acquired Diversified in April 1999 and consolidated itself as a leading PBM for managed care organizations.

In August 2002, the Wall Street Journal wrote that while PBMs had "steered doctors to cheaper drugs, especially low-cost generic copies of branded drugs from big pharmaceutical companies" from 1992 through 2002, they had "quietly moved" into marketing expensive brand name drugs.

In 2007, when CVS acquired Caremark, the function of PBMs changed "from simply processing prescription transactions to managing the pharmacy benefit for health plans", negotiating "drug discounts with pharmaceutical manufacturers", and providing "drug utilization reviews and disease management". PBMs also created a formulary to encourage or even require "health plan participants to use preferred formulary products to treat their conditions". In 2012, Express Scripts and CVS Caremark transitioned from using tiered formularies, to those that excluded drugs from their formulary.

Market and competition
As of 2004, the Federal Trade Commission found PBMs operated in a marketplace with "vigorous competition". And as of 2013, in the United States, a majority of the large managed prescription drug benefit expenditures were conducted by about 60 PBMs. Few PBMs are independently owned and operated. PBM's operate inside of integrated healthcare systems (e.g., Kaiser Permanente or Veterans Health Administration), as part of retail pharmacies,  major chain drug stores (e.g., CVS Pharmacy or Rite-Aid), and as subsidiaries of managed care plans or insurance companies (e.g., UnitedHealth Group). However, in 2016 fewer than 30 major PBM companies were in this category in the US, and only three major PBMs (Express Scripts, CVS Health, and OptumRx of UnitedHealth Group) comprised 78% of the market, covering 180 million enrollees.

In 2015, the three largest public PBMs were Express Scripts, CVS Health (formerly CVS Caremark) and United Health/OptumRx/Catamaran. As of 2018, the three largest PBMs controlled more than 80% of the market.

Express Scripts
In 2012 Express Scripts acquired rival Medco Health Solutions for $29.1 billion and became "a powerhouse in managing prescription drug benefits". As of 2015, Express Scripts Holding Company was the largest pharmacy benefit management organization in the United States. with 2013 revenues of $104.62 billion.

In October 2015 Express Scripts began reviewing pharmacy programs run by AbbVie Inc and Teva Pharmaceuticals Industries Ltd regarding the potential use of tactics that "can allow drugmakers to work around reimbursement restrictions" from Express Scripts and other insurers. These reviews resulted from investigations into "questionable practices" at Valeant Pharmaceuticals International Inc's partner pharmacy, Philidor Rx Services.

CVS Health

In 1994, CVS launched PharmaCare, a pharmacy benefit management company providing a wide range of services to employers, managed care organizations, insurance companies, unions and government agencies. By 2002 CVS' specialty pharmacy ProCare, the "largest integrated retail/mail provider of specialty pharmacy services" in the United States, was consolidated with their pharmacy benefit management company, PharmaCare. Caremark Rx was founded as a unit of Baxter International and in 1992 spun off from Baxter as a publicly traded company. In March 2007, CVS Corporation acquired Caremark to create CVS Caremark, later re-branded as CVS Health.

In 2011 Caremark Rx was the nation's second-largest PBM. Caremark Rx was subject to a class action lawsuit in Tennessee, which alleged that Caremark kept discounts from drug manufacturers instead of sharing them with member benefit plans, secretly negotiated rebates for drugs and kept the money, and provided plan members with more expensive drugs when less expensive alternatives were available. CVS Caremark paid $20 million to three states over fraud allegations.

UnitedHealth Group
OptumRx, one of the Optum businesses of UnitedHealth Group Inc, has been a leading PBM. In March 2015 UnitedHealth Group acquired Catamaran Corporation for about $12.8 billion to extend this PBM business.

Advocacy and lobbying
Many Pharmacy benefit managers are represented by the trade association the Pharmaceutical Care Management Association.

Biosimilars

PBMs have been strong proponents in the creation of a U.S. Food and Drug Administration pathway to approve biosimilar versions of expensive specialty drugs which treat conditions like Alzheimer's, rheumatoid arthritis and multiple sclerosis. PBM's support so-called biosimilar legislation which does not grant brand name drug manufacturers monopoly pricing power. In 2015 the Federal Trade Commission found that patents for biologic products already provide enough incentives for innovation and that additional periods of exclusivity would "not spur the creation of a new biologic drug or indication" and "imperils" the benefits of the approval process.

Controversies and litigation
In 1998, PBMs were under investigation by Assistant U.S. Attorney James Sheehan of the federal Justice Department, and their effectiveness in reducing prescription costs and saving clients money was questioned.

In 2004, litigation added to the uncertainty about PBM practices. In 2015, there were seven lawsuits against PBMs involving fraud, deception, or antitrust claims.

State legislatures have been using "transparency," "fiduciary," and "disclosure" provisions to improve the business practices of PBMs. In 2011, the Mississippi Board of Pharmacy formed a new division of the Pharmacy Benefit Managers, with a mandate to license and regulate PBMs.

A 2013 Centers for Medicare & Medicaid Services study found negotiated prices at mail order pharmacy to be up to 83% higher than the negotiated prices at community pharmacies.

A 2014 ERISA (Employee Retirement Income Security Act of 1974) hearing noted that vertically integrated PBMs may pose conflicts of interest, and that PBMs' health plan sponsors "face considerable obstacles in...determin[ing] compliance with PBM contracts including direct and indirect PBM compensation contract terms".

In 2017, the Los Angeles times wrote that PBMs cause an inflation in drug costs, especially within the area of diabetes drugs.

United States Secretary of Health and Human Services Alex Azar stated regarding PBMs, "Everybody wins when list prices rise, except for the patient. It’s rather a startling and perverse system that has evolved over time."

On January 31, 2019, Health and Human Services released a proposed rule to remove Anti-kickback Statute, safe harbor protections for PBMs and other plan sponsors, that previously allowed PBMs to seek rebates from drug manufacturers.

Ron Wyden said in April 2019 that they were as “clear a middleman rip-off as you are going to find”, because they make more money when they pick a higher priced drug over a lower priced drug.

See also
 Online pharmacy
 Preferred pharmacy network

References

External links
 Pharmacy Benefit Management Institute list of PBM companies

Pharmacy benefit management companies based in the United States